Emil José Martínez Cruz ((born 17 September 1982) is a Honduran former professional footballer who played as a midfielder.

Club career
Martínez made his professional debut for Marathón and played abroad for Alajuelense in the Primera División de Costa Rica and Primera División de México side Indios. Also, he was attached to several clubs in Chinese Super League, including Shanghai Shenhua, Beijing Guoan and Hangzhou Greentown. In January 2012 he joined Hunan Billows. In January 2013, he returned to Marathón along with fellow Hunan player Astor Henríquez.

Martínez finished top scorer and best player on the 07-08 Apertura season while playing for Marathón.

Club career stats
Last update: 6 November 2013

International career
Martínez made his debut for Honduras in a February 2002 Carlsberg Cup match against Slovenia and has earned a total of 66 caps, scoring 3 goals. He has represented his country in 5 FIFA World Cup qualification matches and played at the 2008 Summer Olympics and at the 2003,
2007, 2009 and 2011 UNCAF Nations Cups as well as at the 2003, 2007 and 2011 CONCACAF Gold Cups.

His final international was an October 2011 friendly match against Jamaica.

International goals

|}

Honours
Marathón
Liga Nacional de Fútbol de Honduras: 2001–02 Clausura, 2002–03 Clausura, 2004–05 Apertura, 2007–08 Apertura

Beijing Guoan
Chinese Super League: 2009

References

External links

1982 births
Living people
People from Yoro Department
Association football midfielders
Honduran footballers
Honduras international footballers
Footballers at the 2008 Summer Olympics
Olympic footballers of Honduras
2003 UNCAF Nations Cup players
2003 CONCACAF Gold Cup players
2007 UNCAF Nations Cup players
2007 CONCACAF Gold Cup players
2009 UNCAF Nations Cup players
2011 Copa Centroamericana players
2011 CONCACAF Gold Cup players
C.D. Marathón players
L.D. Alajuelense footballers
Shanghai Shenhua F.C. players
Beijing Guoan F.C. players
Indios de Ciudad Juárez footballers
Zhejiang Professional F.C. players
Hunan Billows players
Honduran expatriate footballers
Expatriate footballers in Costa Rica
Expatriate footballers in Mexico
Expatriate footballers in China
Honduran expatriate sportspeople in China
Chinese Super League players
China League One players
Liga Nacional de Fútbol Profesional de Honduras players
Liga MX players
Liga FPD players
Copa Centroamericana-winning players